The Knights of the Round Table are the legendary knights of the fellowship of King Arthur that first appeared in the Matter of Britain literature in the mid-12th century. The Knights are an order dedicated to ensuring the peace of Arthur's kingdom following an early warring period, entrusted in later years to undergo a mystical quest for the Holy Grail. The Round Table at which they meet is a symbol of the equality of its members, who range from sovereign royals to minor nobles.

The various Round Table stories present an assortment of knights from all over Great Britain and abroad, some of whom are even from outside of Europe. Their ranks often include Arthur's close and distant relatives, as in the cases of Agravain, Gaheris and Yvain, as well as his reconciled former enemies, like Galehaut, Pellinore and Lot. Several of the most notable Knights of the Round Table, among them Bedivere, Gawain and Kay, are based on older characters from a host of great warriors associated with Arthur in the early Welsh tales. Some, such as Lancelot, Perceval and Tristan, feature in the roles of a protagonist or eponymous hero in various works of chivalric romance. Other well-known members of the Round Table include the holy knight Galahad, replacing Perceval as the main Grail Knight in the later stories, and Arthur's traitorous son and nemesis Mordred.

By the end of Arthurian prose cycles (including the seminal Le Morte d'Arthur), the Round Table splits up into groups of warring factions following the revelation of Lancelot's adultery with King Arthur's wife, Queen Guinevere. In the same tradition, Guinevere is featured with her own personal order of young knights, known as the Queen's Knights. Some of these romances retell the story of the Knights of the Old Table, led by Arthur's father, Uther Pendragon, whilst other tales focus on the members of the 'Grail Table'; these were the followers of ancient Christian Joseph of Arimathea, with his Grail Table later serving as the inspiration for Uther and Arthur's subsequent Round Tables.

Numbers of members 

The number of the Knights of the Round Table (including King Arthur) and their names vary greatly between the versions published by different writers. The figure may range from a dozen to as many as 1,600, the latter claimed by Layamon. Most commonly, there are between 100 and 300 seats at the table, often with one seat usually permanently empty (300 was also chosen by Edward III of England when he decided to create his own Order of the Round Table at Windsor Castle in 1344). In many versions there are over 100 members, as with 140 according to Thomas Malory (150 in Caxton's version) and Hartmann von Aue. Some sources state much smaller numbers, such as 13 in the Didot Perceval, 50 in the Prose Merlin (the prose expansion Vulgate Merlin has 250), and 60 in the count by Jean d'Outremeuse. Others state higher numbers, as with 366 in both Perlesvaus and the Chevaliers as deus espees.

Partial lists 
Some of the more notable knights include the following: 

In addition, there are many less prominent knights. For instance, the "Healing of Sir Urry" episode in the Winchester Manuscript of Le Morte d'Arthur lists, in addition to many of the above, the following:

 
Duke Chalance of Clarence
Earl Aristance
Earl of Lambaile (known as the Count of Lambale in French romances; also Lambayle, Lambelle, etc.)
Earl Ulbawes
King Anguish of Ireland
King Claryaunce of Northumberland (Clarion)
King Nentres of Garlot
Sir Arrok
Sir Ascamore
Sir Azreal
Sir Barrant le Apres (also known as the King With the Hundred Knights)
Sir Bellenger le Beau (Bellinger le Beuse, Bellangre the Bewse; son of Alisuander le Orphelin / Alexander the Orphan, slayer of King Mark and supporter of Lancelot)
Sir Belliance le Orgulous
Sir Blamor de Ganis (Blamour, brother of Bleoberis)
Sir Bleoberis de Ganis
Sir Bohart le Cure Hardy
Sir Brandiles
Sir Bryan de Les Iles (Brian de Listinoise)
Sir Cardok
Sir Claryus of Cleremont (Clarius)
Sir Clegis
Sir Clodrus
Sir Crosselm
Sir Damas (reformed co-conspirator of Morgan in the Accolon-Excalibur plot)
Sir Degrave sans Villainy (fought with the giant of the Black Lowe)
Sir Degrevant
Sir Dinas
Sir Dinas le Seneschal de Cornwall
Sir Dodinas le Savage
Sir Dornar
Sir Driaunt
Sir Edward of Orkney (of Caernarfon)
Sir Epinogris (son of King Clariance)
Sir Fergus
Sir Florence (son of Gawain by Sir Brandiles' sister)
Sir Gahalantyne
Sir Galahodin
Sir Galleron of Galway (a Scottish knight from the English Arthurian tradition, also spelled Galaron or Geleron)
Sir Gautere (Gauter, Gaunter)
Sir Gillimere (or Gillimer, not to be confused with similarly named three different Kings of Ireland in early Arthurian chronicles)
Sir Grommer Grummorson (Gromer)
Sir Gumret le Petit (Gwyarte le Petite)
Sir Harry le Fils Lake
Sir Hebes (not Hebes le Renowne)
Sir Hebes le Renowne
Sir Hectymere
Sir Herminde
Sir Hervyse de la Forest Savage
Sir Ironside (Knight of the Red Launds)
Sir Kay l'Estrange (different than Kay le Seneschal)
Sir Lambegus
Sir Lamiel
Sir Lavain (son of Barnard of Ascolat)
Sir Lovell (another son of Gawain by Sir Brandiles' sister)
Sir Mador de la Porte (brother of Gaheris of Karahau)
Sir Marrok (whose wife turned him into a werewolf)
Sir Melias de Lile
Sir Melion of the Mountain
Sir Meliot de Logris
Sir Menaduke
Sir Morganore
Sir Neroveous
Sir Ozanna le Cure Hardy
Sir Perimones (brother to Persant and Pertolepe; called the Red Knight)
Sir Pertolepe
Sir Petipace of Winchelsea
Sir Plaine de Fors (Playne)
Sir Plenorius
Sir Priamus
Sir Pursuant of Inde (or Persant; also known as the Blue Knight)
Sir Reynold
Sir Sadok
Sir Selises of the Dolorous Tower
Sir Sentrail
Sir Severause le Breuse (or Severauce, known for rejecting battles with men in favour of giants, dragons, and wild beasts)
Sir Suppinabiles (Cornish knight Supinabel from the French Tristan legend)
Sir Urry of Hungary (this story's original character and plot device, cursed by a spell of Spanish duchess for killing her son)
Sir Villiars the Valiant

Conversely, the Winchester Round Table features only the knights Sirs Alynore (Alymere), Bedwere (Bedivere), Blubtlrys (Bleoberis), Bors De Ganys (Bors de Ganis), Brumear (Brunor le Noir), Dagonet, Degore, Ectorde Marys (Ector de Maris), Galahallt (Galahault or Galahad), Garethe (Gareth), Gauen (Gawain), Kay, Lamorak, Launcelot Deulake (Lancelot du Lac), Lacotemale Tayle (La Cote Male Taile), Lucane (Lucan), Lybyus Dysconyus (Le Bel Desconneu), Lyonell (Lionel), Mordrede (Mordred), Plomyde (Palomedes), Pelleus (Pelleas), Percyvale (Percival), Safer (Safir), and Trystram Delyens (Tristram de Lyones) for the total of merely 24 (not counting Arthur).

Selected members

Aglovale 

Aglovale de Galis (Agglovale, Aglaval[e], Agloval, Aglován, Aglovaus, etc.; -de Galles, -le Gallois) is the eldest legitimate son of King Pellinore of Galis (Wales), introduced in the Vulgate Lancelot. Like his father and his brothers (who may include Drian, Lamorak, the original Grail hero Perceval, and Tor) he is a Knight of the Round Table. According to the Post Vulgate Cycle, and Thomas Malory's Le Morte d'Arthur, Aglovale is the one who brings his long lost brother Percival to Camelot to be knighted after meeting him by chance in Perceval's woods. In an alternate account in the Livre d'Artus version of the Vulgate Merlin, the young Agloval has all of his fourteen brothers killed during the Saxon wars by the forces of King Rions' relative King Agrippa in their attack on his mother's domain.

In the Livre d'Artus, Agloval then accompanies Gawain and Sagramore in leading an army that defeats the invaders, personally slaying Agrippa but suffering severe wounds. In the Third (Manessier's) Continuation of Perceval, Agloval dies seven years after Percival became the Grail King, causing Percival's retirement to a hermitage to grieve for his final ten years. In the Vulgate Cycle, Aglovale dies accidentally at Gawain's hand during the Quest for the Holy Grail. However, the rewrite in the Post-Vulgate Queste turns it into a deliberate murder, a part of the Orkney clan's long vendetta for the death of King Lot. In Malory, he is among the knights charged by King Arthur with defending the execution of Guinevere, and is killed by unknown hand during the bloody melee when Lancelot and his men rescue the queen.

Aglovale appears prominently in the Dutch romance Moriaen, in which he visits Moorish lands in Africa and meets a Christian princess whom he conceives a child with. He returns home and, thirteen years later, his son Morien comes to find him after which they both return to Morien's lands. In modern works, Aglovale is the eponymous protagonist of Clemence Housman's 1905 novel The Life of Sir Aglovale de Galis.

Arthur the Less 

Arthur the Less or Arthur the Little (Arthur le Petit) is an illegitimate son of King Arthur ("Arthur the Great") found only in the Post-Vulgate Cycle. After Arthur forces himself on a daughter of a knight named Tanas, he orders the child to be named either Guenevere or Arthur the Less. Having been abandoned and raised by a foster mother, the boy appears at Arthur's court on the eve of the Grail Quest when his arrival is miraculously prophesied at Round Table. He is knighted by Tristan and soon proves to be superior to even Gawain and Percival, defeating both of them. However, he is publicly known only as the Unknown Knight, keeping his lineage secret as to not shame his father with the story of his mother's rape. Loyal to King Arthur (who is eventually informed about his son's identity by Morgan), he fights in the late wars against domestic and foreign enemies, and is one of Galahad's companions during the Grail Quest. After his father's death at Salisbury, Arthur the Less is a candidate for the heir of throne of Logres, however he obsessively hates the Lancelot faction, blaming them for the disaster. When he is defeated by Bleoberis in a duel to the death, he curses the entire kingdom in his dying breath. The curse manifests itself through King Mark's devastating invasion, which destroys almost all remnants of King Arthur's rule.

Bleoberis 

Bleoberis de Ganis is a Knight of the Round Table from the land of Ganis (Ganes, Gannes, Gaunes, Gaunnes), meaning probably Gaul or perhaps Vannes, who was first mentioned by Chrétien de Troyes in his Erec and Enide, named therein as Bliobleheris.

Bleoberis features as a major character in the later romances from the French prose cycles and their adaptations, in which he is portrayed as one of the cousins of the hero Lancelot. There he is son of Nestor de Gaunes and godson of Lancelot's father King Bors, as well as brother of his fellow Round Table companion Blamo[u]r[e] (Blanor[e]). In the Vulgate Merlin, the Livre d'Arthur, and Arthour and Merlin, Bleoberis fights alongside his brother Blamoure in the wars against the rebel kings at Bedegraine, against the Saxons at Cameliard, and against King Claudas in the Wasteland; the latter earns him his nickname "of the Wasteland" (de la Deserte). In both the Vulgate and Post-Vulgate versions of the Queste, as well as in the Prose Tristan, he participates in the Grail Quest. In Malory, he is the lord of the Castle of Gannis in Britain. In the Vulgate and the works based on it, Lancelot eventually makes him the Duke of Poitiers for his part in saving Guinevere, after which Bleoberis becomes an important leader in Lancelot's war against Arthur and Gawain. In the Post-Vulgate Mort, he returns to Britain and arrives at Salisbury after the battle to destroy the corpse of Mordred and build the Tower of the Dead. While searching for Lancelot, he meets Arthur's vengeful son Arthur the Less (himself a member of the Round Table as the Unknown Knight), whom he kills in self-defence. Finding Lancelot at a hermitage with the former Archbishop of Canterbury, he joins them; after Lancelot's death, Bleoberis buries his body at Joyous Gard. In Malory, Bleoberis and his brother first live as monks together with Lancelot and the rest of his kinsmen at Glastonbury Tor, then leave on a crusade and together die in battle in Jerusalem.

He also appears in some tales as an opponent whom the story's hero must overcome during the course of a quest or an adventure. In the Prose Tristan, Bleoberis abducts Segwarides' wife from King Mark's court, and fights for her against first Segwarides and later the protagonist Tristan. In Wigalois, one of the challenges faced by the protagonist Wigalois (Gawain's son, Gingalain) is to defeat Bleoberis, the fierce guardian of the Perilous Ford. He is similarly the first adversary conquered by Gawain's son Guinglan in Le Bel Inconnu. In Parzival, Orgeluse's suitor boasts of having him either slain or defeated but spared (depending on interpretation of the text). In Tristrant, he is one of King Mark's vassals and an enemy of Tristan, who brutally kills him during his escape from Mark's court.

His name is considered to have been derived from the 12th-century Welsh storyteller known as Bledhericus or Bleheris (possibly Bledri ap Cydifor), who is mentioned in several texts, including being credited by Thomas of Britain and Wauchier de Denain as the original source of their early Arthurian poems. References to the narrative authority of Master Blihis repeat in the Elucidation, in which the character of Blihos-Bliheris  appears as the final opponent for Gawain.

Brandelis 

Brandelis (Brandalus, Brandel, Brandeles, Brandellis, Brendalis, etc.) is the name of a number of Arthurian romance characters, including multiple Knights of the Round Table from the French prose tradition. As in the case of several other Arthurian characters, such as King Ban, they might have been derived from the Welsh mythology's figure of Brân.

The best known of these was originally known as Bran de Lis (Brans, Bras, -de Lys), a character related to one of the mothers of the illegitimate sons of Gawain. Bran first appears in the First Continuation of Chrétien's Perceval as one of the brothers of Guilorete (Gloriete) of the Castle Lis, the mother of Gawain's son Lionel (Lioniaus). After Gawain had slain Bran's father Norroiz (Norrois, also Yder de Lis) and two of his brothers (Meliant and Guilorete) in the previous duels in the long feud against him for seducing Guilorete, Bran is about to fight him as well, but they are stopped by Arthur and later become friends. This story is retold in The Jeaste of Sir Gawain, where he appears as Brandles (the name also used for one of Arthur's knights in Sir Gawain and the Carle of Carlisle), and in the Scottish Golagros and Gawane, where he is called Spinagros. In Perlesvaus, Brandalus (Brun[s] Brandelis) de Gales (of Wales) is one of Perceval's uncles along with King Alain, whose name (and title) is shared with the father of Floree, mother of Gawain's son Guinglain in the Vulgate Cycle. In Malory's Le Morte d'Arthur, Brandiles (Brandyles) is brother of the mother of Gawain's sons (and later his companions at the Round Table) Gingalin, Lovel and Florence.

Sir Brandeliz (Brandalis, Brandelis, Braudaliz) appears in multiple episodes through the Vulgate Cycle (some of which are included in Le Morte d'Arthur), participating in the quests (including the quest for the Grail) and in the wars against Claudas and Galahaut. In the prose cycles, he dies while fighting either against Lancelot during the latter's rescue of the condemned Guinevere or against Mordred in the final battle. In the standalone romance Claris et Laris, Brandaliz is one of the eleven protagonists other than the eponymous duo; here he is a friend of Claris who, with the help of Merlin, rescues Laris from the prison of the Danish king Tallas among his other acts. In both narratives, he is also repeatedly freed from enemy captivity by the other heroes, including Gawain, Lancelot, and Claris. The Vulgate Lancelot story of Gaheriet's rescue of Brandeliz and his lady might have been rewritten by Malory as an early episode of his "Tale of Sir Gareth", the fourth book of Le Morte d'Arthur. In the Prose Tristan, Brandeliz is a Knight of the Round Table from Cornwall, not Wales.

The Vulgate Cycle also features a different Knight of the Round Table other than Sir Brandeliz, a minor character of Duke Brandelis de Taningues (Brandeban, Brandeharz, Brandelz, -de Tranurgor). Yet another Knight of the Round Table named Brandelis (Brandelis le fils Lac, that is "son of Lac") appears as brother of Erec in Palamedes and the late Italian romance I Due Tristani. The late French romance Ysaïe le Triste features Brandalis' own son, Brandor de Gaunes (of Wales). In the Didot Perceval, Peredur's uncle is one Brendalis of Wales who also has a brother named Brwns Brandalis.

A few other Brandalis characters are clearly unrelated to the Round Table, such as that of the Vulgate's Saxon king Brandalis (Braundalis, Maundalis). However, some scholars have connected Bran de Lis with the villains Brian des Isles (Brian of the Isles) from Perlesvaus and Brandin (Branduz) des Isles from the Vulgate Lancelot, as well as to King Brandelidelin from an early German Arthurian romance Parzival, as possibly identical in origin.

Calogrenant 

Calogrenant, sometimes known in English as Colgrevance and in German (Diu Crône) as Kalogrenant, among many other variants (including Calogrenan[s/z], Calogrevant, Calogrinant, Colgrevaunce, Galogrinans, Kalebrant, Kalocreant, Qualogrenans), is a Knight of the Round Table and cousin to Yvain. His character has been derived from the Welsh mythological hero Cynon ap Clydno, usually the lover of Owain mab Urien's sister Morvydd; although in Owain, or the Lady of the Fountain, Cynon is stated to be the son of Clydno, possibly connected to Clyddno Eiddin. Roger Sherman Loomis and other scholars speculated that Calogrenant was used specifically as a foil for Kay in some lost early version of Yvain's story. The 12th-century author Chrétien de Troyes characterized him as everything Kay is not: polite, respectful, eloquent, and well-mannered. By this theory, his name can be deconstructed to "Cai lo grenant", or "Cai the grumbler", which would represent another opposite characteristic of Kay, who was famous for his acid tongue.

Calogrenant first appears in Chrétien's Yvain, the Knight of the Lion, telling a story to a group of knights and Queen Guinevere. He describes an adventure he had in the forest of Brocéliande, in which there was a magic spring that could summon a large storm. Calogrenant reached the spring and summoned the storm, after which a knight named Esclados attacked and defeated him. Yvain is upset that Calogrenant never told him of this defeat, and sets out to avenge him, embarking on the adventure that sets up the remainder of events in the romance.

Calogrenant appears later in the Lancelot-Grail cycle, though his kinship to Yvain is not as clear as in Chrétien. He dies during the Grail Quest while trying to keep Lionel from killing his own brother, Bors. Bors had faced a dilemma over whom to rescue between Lionel, who was getting beaten with thorns by two rogue knights, and a maiden who had just been abducted, and chose the maiden over his brother. Lionel was not pleased by this, and attacked Bors the next time he saw him. A hermit tried to intervene, but was killed accidentally in the process, and Calogrenant stepped in. Bors refuses fight his brother, who slays Calogrenant before attacking Bors; however, God intervenes and renders him immobile. Thomas Malory recounts Calogrenant's death scene in his Le Morte d'Arthur, but also includes another one later in the narrative. Despite having died on the Grail quest, he reappears as one of the twelve knights who help Agravaine and Mordred trap Lancelot and Guinevere together in the queen's chambers. Lancelot has neither armour nor weapons, but manages to pull Calogrenant into the room and kills him; he then uses Calogrenant's sword to defeat the rest of Mordred's companions.

Claudin 
Prince Claudin (Claudine, Claudyne, Claudino) is the son of the Frankish King Claudas of the Wasteland (de la Deserte) who appears in the Lancelot-Grail prose cycle, the Prose Tristan, the Post-Vulgate Cycle, and Le Morte d'Arthur. His father, who he fights for, is a major villain during King Arthur's early reign. However, when Claudas eventually loses the war and flees to Rome, Claudin surrenders and defects to Arthur, who makes him a member of the Round Table. During the Grail Quest, Claudin is one of the companions of Bors the Younger, Galahad and Perceval in Corbenic.

Cligès 
Cligès is the title hero of Chrétien de Troyes' French poem Cligès (and its foreign versions). There, he is an offspring of Arthur's niece Soredamors and Alexander, a son of the Greek (Byzantine) Emperor. Following his adventures, Cliges eventually marries Fenice, a daughter of the German Emperor, and becomes the Greek Emperor himself.

As Cligés (Clicés, Clies, Clygés), he also appears in some other French Arthurian romances, including in the First Continuation of Chrétien's Perceval (where his father is named King Lac) and in Claris et Laris. In the Romanz du reis Yder, he serves Queen Guenloie (Guinevere) until he is expelled from her court after he criticizes her love for Yder (who later promises to reconcile them). In , he hails from Greece and participates in the quest to conquer Rigomer Castle as one of Gawain's many companions; he also defeats the undead knight in his own episode. As Clias the Greek (der Grieche Clîas), he has a role in the German Parzival. Thomas Malory's Urry list calls him Sir Clegis (despite a similar name, Clegis is not in any way connected with the English Sir Cleges, the hero of a completely different story set in the times of Arthur's father Uther Pendragon).

Dodinel 

Dodinel (Dodinas, Dodine[i]s, Dôdînes, Dodinia[u]s, Dodin[s], Dodynas, Dodynel, Didones, Dydonel[l], Lionel, etc.) le Sauvage (le Savage, le Salvage, li Sauvages, li Salvages, el Salvaje, der Wilde, etc.), variously translated to English as the Wild, the Wildman, or the Savage (sometimes also as the descriptive "impetuous" or "fierce"), is a Knight of the Round Table found in a great many works of Arthurian romance, typically featured as a well-known knight yet merely a figurant type of a character, and without a common role. He is nevertheless important in several of such works, including the Third Continuation of Perceval, the Vulgate Lancelot, the Post-Vulgate Merlin, the Livre d'Artus, the Prose Tristan, and Claris et Laris.

Dodinel is introduced in Chrétien de Troyes' Erec et Enide, being named there as the ninth best of King Arthur's knights, albeit noted as a rude one. Dodinel is also listed among the top knights of Arthur in Chrétien's Yvain as well as in Sir Gawaine and the Green Knight, while The Knight of the Two Swords describes him as a "truly exceptional ... man of many virtues." He might have been originally identical with Percival, which would explain his characteristic epiteth as meaning a man from the woods (wilderness). However, the only possible trace of such motif can be found in the German Lanzelet, in which Dodines lives a double life: as an enchanter owning a magic horse and dwelling near the dangerous Shrieking Marsh (Schreiende Moos) in the summer, and as a knight in Arthur's lands in the winter.

As with his other characteristics, Dodinel's family relations are variably told. In the Vulgate Merlin Continuation, he is portrayed as an illegitimate son of either King Brandegorre or King Bélinant (Balinant, Belinans, Belynans; possibly based on the Celtic god Belinus) de Sorgales ("of South Wales"; Norgales / North Wales in the Vulgate Lancelot) and Eglatine (Eglantine, Eglante, Eglente), and cousin of Galeschin. In the Lancelot en prose, he is son of King Nantres and Queen Blasine (Arthur's sister), and brother of Galescin. In the Huth-Merlin, he is son of Balin's brother Balaan le Sauvage. In the Didot-Perceval, he is son of the Lady of Malehaut (Dame de Malohaut). In Parzival, he has a brother called Taurian the Wild (der Wilde).

In the Third Continuation of Chrétien's Perceval, one of the six episodes of Gawain's adventures relate his rescue of the "handsome and valiant" Dodinel (Dodinal) from a prison and his lover from a pyre, the latter then also again saved by Perceval. Dodinel is prominent in Claris et Laris, portrayed there as a comical side story character, a Dinadan-like humorously anti-chivalric knight, one who avoids dangerous combat in his wanderings and once escapes from a captivity by posing as a minstrel. He and Dinadan are themselves friends in the Meliadus Compilation; in the Marvels of Rigomer, Dodinel is one of Gawain's quest companions. Thomas Malory in his Le Morte d'Arthur, following some of the Dodinel material from the Vulgate Lancelot as well as his portrayal in the Prose Tristan, has him (named as Dodinas le Savage in the Winchester Manuscript) as a recurring companion of Sagramore and, early in his career, as one of the Guinevere's own ten knights.

His 'biography' can be found in the French prose cycles. In the Vulgate Merlin and the Livre d'Artus, the young teenage Dodinel defects to Arthur early in the king's reign, opposing his own family. In the Livre, he kills the Saxon king Mathmas at the Battle of Clarence (Badon). Having been knighted by Arthur, he joins the Queen's Knights and eventually the Round Table. The Vulgate Lancelot, besides telling the stories of Lancelot's rescues of the captive Dodinel on multiple occasions, has him as one of the only five knights who cross the perilous bridge into Sorelois alive (besides Gawain, Meliant, Yder and Arthur). In the Vulgate Queste, he is one of the Grail knights in Galahad's company. In the Post-Vulgate, Lamorak is slain by Gawain and his brothers when he is injured following an earlier fight with Dodinel. In the end, Dodinel dies fighting against Mordred's forces at the Battle of Salisbury Plain (Camlann).

In Italy, he is called Dondinello and its variants, usually with no epithet (except in the case of Oddinello le Salvaggio in the Tristano Riccardiano). In his unusual characterization in Chantari di Lancelotto, Dodinel (Dudinello) is a villain who joins up with Mordred to conspire against Lancelot. Cantari di Carduino, a Fair Unknown type epic poem possibly based on a lost Dodinel romance, tells the story of his eponymous son Carduino's vengeance against the clan of Gawain for having his father fatally poisoned by the jealous lords including Mordred and Augerisse (probably Gaheris), as well as of Carduino's other adventures.

Drian 
Drian (Doryan, Driant, Durnor) is one of King Pellinore's sons out of wedlock. He is most prominent in the Prose Tristan which describes him as one of the very best of the Knights, alongside Galahad, Lancelot, Palamedes, and his own brother Lamorak. There, Drian and Lamorak are hated by Gawain for being sons of Pellinore and for being superior knights to Gawain. Drian dies when he fights three of King Lot's sons, unhorsing Agravain and Mordred before being mortally wounded and left for dead by Gawain; Lamorak dies soon afterwards while trying to avenge him.

Drian is called Dornar (Durnor[e]) by Thomas Malory in Le Morte d'Arthur, where he is also killed by Gawain. He appears alongside two knights named Darnarde and Dryaun (Dryaunt,  Tryan), both of them also derived from the French Drian. Malory splits Drian's adventures from the Prose Tristan between the latter two: Dryaun guards a bridge with his brother Alain (one of Drian's other brothers), jousting the passing knights; Darnarde visits King Mark's court with Lamorak, where they defeat Mark and all of his knights but Tristan. Darnarde is eventually killed alongside his brothers, Aglovale and Tor, when Lancelot rescues Queen Guinevere from the stake.

Elyan 

Elyan the White or Helyan le Blanc (also Elain, Elayn, Helain, Hellaine, Helin; -le Blank, -the Pale) is son of Bors the Younger in the prose romance tradition of Lancelot-Grail (Vulgate Cycle). His mother, Claire, has tricked Bors into sleeping with her using a magic ring (the only time Bors broke his vow of chastity). Claire is daughter of British king Brandegore (Brandegorre, Brandegoris) and also half-sister of Sagramore, and their shared mother is daughter of the Eastern Roman Emperor. At the age of 15, Elyan is brought to Arthur's court by Bors. He then becomes known as an excellent knight and is accepted as a member to the Round Table. True to his lineage, Elyan eventually becomes Emperor of Constantinople himself.

Elyan's adventures are different the Post-Vulgate Queste, as well as the expanded version of the Prose Tristan, where he takes a vacant Round Table seat that had belonged to Dragan (Dagarius) after the latter knight's death by Tristan. He later helps his cousin Lancelot rescue Guinevere after their affair is exposed, and then joins him in exile during their war with Arthur.

Elyan should not be confused with Elians (Eliant, Elianz), a Knight of the Round Table from Ireland who occupied Lancelot's vacant seat in both the Vulgate and Post-Vulgate versions of the Mort Artu. A modern character inspired by Elyan the White was portrayed by Nigerian actor Adetomiwa Edun as Guinevere's brother in the 2008 television series Merlin.

Erec 

Erec (French Erech, Eric, Herec, Heret; German Eres; Italian Arecco; Norse Erex), the son of King Lac, is most famous as the protagonist in Chrétien de Troyes' first romance, Erec and Enide, later retold in Erec and other versions. Because of Erec and Enide‘s connection to the Welsh Geraint and Enid, Erec and Geraint are often conflated or confused. Erec's name itself may be derived from 'Guerec', the Breton version of 'Gweir' which was the name of several of Arthur's warriors and relatives in the different early Welsh tales.

In Chrétien's story, Erec meets his future wife Enide while on a quest to defeat a knight who had mistreated one of Queen Guinevere's servants. The two fall in love and marry, but rumours spread that Erec no longer cares for knighthood or anything else besides his domestic life. Enide cries about these rumours, causing Erec to prove his abilities, both to himself and to his wife, through a test of Enide's love for him. Erec has her accompany him on a long, tortuous trip where she is forbidden to speak to him, after which they reconcile. When Erec's father Lac dies, Erec inherits his kingdom. The Norse Erex Saga gives him two sons, named Llac and Odus, who later both become kings. The story of Erec and Enide is also retold within the Prose Tristan.

Enide is entirely absent from the Prose Erec part of the Post-Vulgate Merlin Continuation, in which Erec's mother's enchantment makes him immune to magic. His acts include saving Bors from the enchanter Mabon; he also has a cousin named Driadam, whose death begins Erec's feud with the young Mordred. In the Post-Vulgate Quest of the Holy Grail, Erec is slain by Gawain in revenge for the death of Yvain of the White Hands, and does not regain his father's kingdom; his seat at the Round Table is taken by his friend Meraugis, who had buried him. In the Alliterative Morte Arthure, Erec dies during the final battle between the forces of Arthur and Mordred.

In Lanzelet, Erec and Gawain agree to be delivered as prisoners to the great wizard Malduc (whose father was killed by Erec), so that Guinevere can be rescued from King Valerin's castle; they are then tortured and almost starved to death in Malduc's dungeon, until they are eventually themselves rescued. In Le Morte d'Arthur, Harry le Fyse Lake (or Garry le Fitz Lake, Malory's corruption of the French Herec le Fils Lac) participates in Lancelot's rescue of Guinevere from the stake.

Esclabor 

King Esclabor the Unknown (Astlabor, Esclabort, Scalabrone; -le Mescogneu, -li Mesconneü, -li Mesconneuz) is a wandering Saracen lord from a vaguely Middle Eastern land, usually either Babylon (in today's Iraq) or Galilee (in today's Israel). He is the father of Palamedes, Safir, and Segwarides, among others. During his long stay in Britain, Esclabor initially hides his faith, trying to pass as a Christian, but soon becomes widely known as a valiant pagan knight.

While visiting Rome, he saves the life of the Roman Emperor; he later travels to Arthur's Logres at the time of Arthur's coronation, where he rescues King Pellinore as well. Esclabor eventually settles at Camelot, later adventuring with Palamedes and Galahad during the Grail Quest. In the Post-Vulgate Queste, eleven of his sons are killed during their encounter with the Questing Beast. Shortly after finally agreeing to convert to Christianity, an act necessary for the full admission into the brotherhood of Round Table, and which also allows his participation in the Grail Quest, Esclabor commits suicide from grief upon learning of his favorite son Palamedes' death at the hands of Gawain.

Gaheris of Karaheu 
Gaheris de Karaheu (Gaharis, Gaheran, Gahetis, Gaherys, Gaheus, Gains, Gareis, Ghaheris; -d'Escareu, -de Carahan/Car[a/e]heu, -de Gaheran/Gahereu, -de Karahau/Karehan), also known as the White (li Blans), is one of the minor Knights of the Round Table and brother of Mador de la Porte in the Vulgate Cycle and the derived works. He should not be confused with Gaheris of Orkney, one of King Arthur's nephews and another Knight of the Round Table. His most prominent role, including the manner of his death, might have been inspired by the purportedly historical account of the fatal poisoning of Walwen (that is,   Gawain) from the chronicle Gesta Regum Anglorum.

In the Vulgate Lancelot, Gaheris of Karaheu appears in minor roles, mostly as a prisoner, prior to his accidental death. Gawain saves him from Galehaut, while the mysterious White Knight (Lancelot incognito) rescues him from the Dolorous Prison near Dolorous Gard and then again from the Vale of No Return. Later, in the Vulgate Mort Artu, he dies from eating a poisoned apple, which was made by the knight Avarlan and was meant to kill Gawain. The apple is offered to Gaheris unknowingly by Guinevere; the queen is accused of his murder, until she is cleared of the charge in the trial by combat between Mador and Lancelot. This story is retold in the Stanzaic Morte Arthur and in Thomas Malory's Le Morte d'Arthur, where the victim is, respectively, either an unnamed visiting Scottish knight or Sir Patrise of Ireland (the poisoner is also renamed by Malory as Sir Pionel). The Italian Tristano Panciaticchiano, in which he remains Mador's brother, calls him Giafredi.

Galehodin 
Galehodin le Gallois (Galeh[a/o]udin, also Gal[l]ides, Gallind[r]es, etc.) is Galehaut's nephew and godson, and his designated successor as the King of Sorelois. Galehodin is introduced in the Prose Lancelot as the young grandson of the King of Norgales (North Wales). There he is the lord of the town and castle of Pennin (Peningue), and desires to follow the great hero Lancelot so he can learn from him. He is described as one of the tallest knights in the world, using a plain white shield with no identification symbols. Together with Mordred and Mador, he easily triumphs over the men of Gorre in a tournament against King Bagdemagus. In the Italian Tavola Ritonda, Galehaut's heir is his son named Abastunagio, a character corresponding with that of Galehodin as he appears in the Prose Tristan. Both appear in their respective texts in the role of the host of the great tournament in Sorelois. The Hebrew King Artus includes one Galaodin de Gaulis (of Gaul) among Lancelot's followers.

Galehaut's cousin and fellow Knight of the Round Table named Galahodin (Galihodin, Galyhodin, sometimes with 'yn' at the end) appears as one of closest companions of Lancelot in Thomas Malory's telling, in which Galahodin is given some of Galehaut's traits from the French tradition. Galahodin, described as a sub-king in Sorelois, serves Lancelot as one of his chief knights during the war against Arthur, later joining him in the hermitage at the end of his life. Before that, one of the episodes borrowed from the Prose Tristan tell of Galahodin's attempted kidnapping of Isolde, foiled by Palamedes. Malory's Galahodin should not be confused with two of his original characters from Le Morte d'Arthur, Lancelot's own relatives Galyhod (Galihud, Galyhud) and Gahalantyne (Gahalantin), who are also close companions of Lancelot. After taking over the lands in France, Malory's Lancelot appoints Galahodin as the duke of Saintonge, Galyhod as the earl of Périgord, and Gahalantyne as the duke of Auvergne. They eventually stay together with Lancelot and Galahodin as their fellow monks at the end.

Galeschin 

Galeschin (Galaas, Galachin, Galathin, Galescalain, Galeschalains, Galescin[s], Galeshin,  Galessin, etc.) is the son of King Arthur's half-sister Queen Elaine and King Nentres of Garlot. He first appears in the story of the Dolorous Tower in the Vulgate Cycle, in which he and his cousin Yvain attempt to rescue their other cousin Gawain from the wicked lord Carados; both are taken captive as well, but the trio are eventually rescued by Lancelot. (Galeschin is later additionally rescued by Lancelot from the Vale of No Return.) Though mentioned in a few other stories, his role is ultimately minor. He loosely inspired the character of Duke Chalance (Chalaunce) of Clarence, a Knight of the Round Table appearing in different episodes of Le Morte d'Arthur.

Roger Sherman Loomis derives the name Galeschin from the name Galvariun, found on the Modena Archivolt. He theorizes that the name was altered to make it sound more like Galesche, the Old French word for Gaul, and derives the name Galvariun from the epithet Gwallt Euryn, found in Culhwch and Olwen, which he translates as "Golden Hair". Oddly, Galeschin is also called the Duc de Clarence in the French literature prior to the 14th century; this could not possibly refer to the position of Duke of Clarence (which did not exist yet at the time and does not refer to a place name), leading Loomis to translate it as the "Lord of Light".

Gornemant 
Gornemant de Gohort (Gorneman[s/z]; -de Goort, de Gorhaut) is the knight best known as Percival's old mentor. He is mentioned in a few early romances and is prominent in Chrétien de Troyes's Perceval, the Story of the Grail, in which he instructs the young hero in the ways of knighthood. There, Gornemant is also the uncle of Blanchefleur, whom Percival later marries after successfully defending her city against attackers. Medieval German author Wolfram von Eschenbach gives Gurnemans three sons named Gurzgi, Lascoyt and Schentefleurs, as well as a daughter named Liaze who falls in love with Percival but he declines to marry her. In the later Italian Tristan romances, he appears under the name Governale, entrusted by Merlino to care for and edecate the young Cornish prince Tristano. In modern era, Gurnemanz is one of the main Grail Knights in Richard Wagner's opera Parsifal.

Griflet 

Griflet the son of Do is a ubiquitous character in Arthurian legend, where he was one of the first Knights of the Round Table. He is first found in Chrétien de Troyes' Erec et Enide, named there as Girflez li filz Do. Like many other Arthurian romance characters, his origins lie in Welsh mythology; in this instance, it is the minor deity Gilfaethwy fab Dôn. He is notably the eponymous hero of his own, early chivalric romance, Jaufre.

He also appears as Gerflet in Beroul's Tristan and in the Norse Parcevals Saga; Gerflet li fius Do in Mériadeuc; Gifflet in Escanor; Gifflet (Girfles) li fieus Do in the Livre d'Artus; Giflés (Gifles) li fius Do in Perceval ou le Conte du Graal, Li Biaus Descouneüs, and Libeaus Desconus; Giflet le fils de Do in Le Bel Inconnu; Giflet fis Do in Sir Gawain and the Lady of Lys; Girflet (Giflet, Giflez, Giftet, Girfles, Gyfles, Gyflet, Gyrflet) le (li) fils (filz) Do (Doon, Dos) in the Vulgate and Post-Vulgate prose cycles; Girfles (Girlflet, Girflez) li filz Do in the Prose Tristan; Girflez le fils Do in Lancelot, le Chevalier de la Charrette; Girflez in La Mule sans Frein; Griflet (Gifles, Gifflès, Gifflet, Gryflet, Gryfflet) li fieus Do (Dou) in Le Morte d'Arthur; Grifles in Henry Lovelich's Merlin; Grimfles in the English Prose Merlin; Gyffroun in Ywain and Gawain; and Iofreit (Jofreit) fils Idol in Parzival. Further texts featuring him include Hunbaut, La Vengeance Raguidel, and the First and Fourth Continuations of Perceval.

In French chivalric romance prose cycles, he is a cousin to Lucan and Bedivere who first appears as a loyal and valiant young squire at the beginning of King Arthur's rule. About the same age as Arthur, he distinguishes himself in the Battle of Bedegraine against the rebels and joins the Round Table after personally slaying one of the Saxon kings when he helps Kay and Gawain rescue Guinevere in the Prose Merlin. Later, however, his role becomes largely limited to him notoriously often falling into captivity for the other knights to rescue in the course of their own adventures, even leading Gawain to comment in the Prose Lancelot that "there never was a man so frequently taken prisoner as Girflet has been." According to the French Mort Artu, he was one of the few survivors of Arthur's final battle and was asked by the dying king to return his sword Excalibur to the Lady of the Lake. In Le Morte d'Arthur, however, Sir Griflet is one of the knights killed by Lancelot's rescue party at the execution of Guinevere, making Griflet's cousin Bedivere the knight who casts away Excalibur, the role that has been given to Bedivere also in the earlier English adaptations of the Mort Artu.

Hector de Maris 

Hector de Maris (Ector de Maris, Estor de Mareis, Hector de Marais, Hestor des Mares, etc.) is the younger half-brother of Lancelot; Bors and Lionel are his cousins. His name means Hector of the Fens (the form used in Norris J. Lacy's translation of the Vulgate Cycle); he should not be mistaken with Sir Ector (Hector), the father of Kay and foster father of Arthur. Hector's adventures are many and wide-ranging, especially within the Vulgate and the Post-Vulgate prose cycles. As Astore, he is also the eponymous protagonist of the Italian Cantare di Astore e Morgana.

As told in the Vulgate Merlin, Hector is an illegitimate son of King Ban of Benoic (in today's France), who, magically helped by Merlin, fathered him with the Lady de Maris. He is raised by his maternal grandfather Agravadain the Black, lord of the Castle of the Fens. In the Vulgate Lancelot, Hector fights against the Saxons and saves his relative Elaine the Peerless. He is successful at tournaments, prevailing against such esteemed knights as Palomedes and Perceval. Hector is, however, one of the knights defeated and imprisoned by Turquine before being rescued by his brother Lancelot; he later returns the favour by finding the lost Knight of the Lake after Lancelot's period of insanity and returning him to the court. Hector has a long relationship with Lady Perse of the Narrow Borderland after saving her from a forced marriage; he also has an affair with a cousin of the Lady of Roestoc prior to reuniting with Perse. In the Post-Vulgate Queste, his friendship with Gawain turns into the hatred following Gawain's killing of Erec. Hector participates in the great Grail Quest, during which his companions besides Gawain include Arthur the Less and Meraugis. Like most others, Hector is proven unworthy of achieving the sacred relic. Nevertheless, he helps the Grail hero Galahad to destroy the Castle of Treachery, and the appearance of the Grail revives him and Perceval after the two mortally wounded each other. In the Mort Artu (and Le Morte d'Arthur), when Lancelot is caught in his affair with Guinevere, Hector stands by his half-brother and leaves court with him. He becomes one of the top leaders of Lancelot's faction, participating in the battle to rescue the queen at her would-be execution and the subsequent defence of Lancelot's castle Joyous Guard. Hector accompanies Lancelot in France when they are expelled from Arthur's kingdom, before later returning to Britain to help defeat the Saxon army aided by Mordred's sons after the Battle of Camlann (Salisbury). He then joins his brother at the Archbishop of Canterbury's hermitage, and later dies on a crusade in the Holy Land.

King with the Hundred Knights 
The King with the Hundred Knights (Old French: Roi des Cent Chevaliers, sometimes translated as the "King of the Hundred Knights") is a moniker commonly used in for a character that has appeared under different given names in various works of Arthurian romance, including as Malaguin (Aguignier, Aguigens, Aguigniez, Aguysans, Alguigines, Angvigenes, Malaguis, Malauguin[s], etc.) in the Prose Lancelot; the legendary figure of Malaguin seems to be loosely based on that of the historical Maelgwn, an early 6th-century king of Gwynedd known for propagating Christianity in Britain. He appears as Heraut  (Berant, Horel, Horiaus, Hovaux, etc.) li Aspres in the Prose Tristan, while Thomas Malory refers to him as Sir Barant (Berrant) le Apres. Conversely, some texts such as Palamedes do not give him a proper name.

His first known appearance is possibly in Lanzelet as Ritschart, a count opposing King Lot who is mentioned as having a hundred knights and is later aided by Lancelot, followed by that of Margon in the Third Continuation of Perceval, the Story of the Grail. His first major role as the "King with the Hundred Knights" is found in the Vulgate and Post-Vulgate versions of Merlin continuations, in which he is introduced as one of the chief rebels against King Arthur in the Battle of Bedegraine; however, after experiencing a prophetic dream, he decides to join Arthur to fight the invading Saxon pagans in God's name. He remains on Arthur's side during Lot's second rebellion, but then fights against Arthur in the service of Galehaut in the Vulgate Lancelot; afterwards, he again submits to Arthur's rule and joins the Round Table, later taking part in the war against Rome. (The chronology of that is different in Malory's compilation.) Lancelot of the Laik, a Scots version of the Vulgate Lancelot, splits his character into these of the King with a Hundred Knights and Maleginis, two different minor kings serving Galehaut.

He is described as the ruler of the land variably known as Estrangore in the Livre d'Artus alternative continuation of Merlin, Malahaut (Malehaut, etc.) in the Estoire de Merlin and the Prose Lancelot, Guzilagne in La Tavola Ritonda, Piacenza in I Due Tristani, and Tumane in Lanzelet. The Vulgate Lancelot gives him a sister known only as the Lady of Malahaut, a son named Maranz (Marant, Marauz, Martans, Martant), and a daughter named Landoine (Landoigne). The Prose Tristan and Le Morte d'Arthur mention him as a lover of one of Morgan le Fay's companions, the enchantress known as the Queen of North Wales. In I Due Tristani, he marries Riccarda, the half-giant sister of Galehaut. In the Third Continuation of Perceval, his son, named Cargril (Cargrilo), falls in one-sided love with Perceval's cousin Sore Pucelle; Margon and Cargril besiege her castle but Gawain lifts the siege and Sore Pucelle avenges the death of her lover (whom they had hanged) by launching Cargril from a catapult. In La Tavola Ritonda, the King with the Hundred Knights dies fighting alongside King Amoroldo of Ireland (an Italian version of Morholt) at the Battle of Lerline, in a factional conflict in which Lancelot and Tristan find themselves on the opposing sides.

Lac 
King Lac (French: Roi Lac, literally "King Lake") is the father of Erec introduced in Chrétien de Troyes' Erec and Enide and its variants. His counterpart in the Welsh Geraint and Enid is named Erbin. His kingdom is variably known as Nantes, Destrigales ("Outer Wales", possibly South Wales), Carnant, Greater Orkney (Orcanie la Grant), and Black Isles. In the Guiron le Courteous part of Palamedes, King Lac is himself a Knight of the Round Table. Thomas Malory retained him in this role in his Le Morte d'Arthur as the King of the Lake. He is entirely unrelated to Lancelot du Lac (of the Lake) and to King Lot whose name is written as "Lac" in some Portuguese texts.

According to Erec et Enide, King Lac dies of old age and his son Erec is made ruler of Lac's kingdom by King Arthur. In his redefinition in the Post-Vulgate Cycle, King Lac is son of Canan, a peasant-born Greek king. The Post-Vulgate Quest of the Holy Grail tells of Lac's poisoning by the sons of his brother, King Dirac, and the young Erec's exile from their kingdom of Saloliqui to Britain following Lac's murder. In this version, Lac was married to the sorceress Crisea (Ocise), who was the sister of Pelles, the Fisher King. Besides Erec, King Lac's children include a daughter, who appears unnamed in Chrétien's Perceval and is called Jeschute in Parzival. Lac's other sons include Brandelis in Palamedes and in I Due Tristani, and Cligés in the First Continuation of Perceval, who both become Knights of the Round Table in their respective stories.

Lohot 
Lohot (Hoot, Loholt, Loholz, Lohoot, Lohoth, Lohoz) is a character loosely based on the mysterious figure of Llacheu, one of the sons of King Arthur in the original Welsh tradition. He appears as the king's legitimate son by Queen Guinevere in the early continental romances such as Lanzelet and Perlesvaus (as Ilinot and Elinot, respectively). In Perlesvaus, he is treacherously killed by Kay so that the latter can take credit for the defeat of the giant Logrin, and his murder causes Guinevere to die of sorrow.

In the Vulgate Cycle, on the other hand, Lohot is Arthur's bastard son by Lady Lisanor, daughter of Earl Sevain, from the tryst magically arranged by Merlin. Lohot dies young from illness shortly after having been rescued from his captivity in the Dolorous Prison by Lancelot. Thomas Malory renamed him as a very minor character called Borre (Boarte, Bohart, Bohort) le Cure Hardy ("the Strong Heart"), and his mother as Lionors or Lyzianor, daughter of Earl Sanam.

Lucan 

Lucan the Butler (Lucanere de Buttelere, Lucan[s] li Bouteillier, Lucant le Boutellier, Lucas the Botiller, Lucanus, etc.) is a servant of King Arthur, the son of Duke Corneus, a brother of Bedivere, and a cousin of Griflet. His earliest mention is in Erec and Enide and he is also known in English translations as Lucan the Wine Steward. He and his relatives are among King Arthur's earliest allies in the war against the rebel kings and then remain loyal to Arthur throughout his life. Lucan takes on the post of royal butler, a significant position in charge of the royal household. As such he is in charge of the royal court, along with Bedivere the Marshal and Kay the Seneschal. 

Lucan fights for Arthur's right to the throne at the Battle of Bedegraine and against subsequent rebellions. He is also known to always attend the royal tournaments. In most accounts of Arthur's death in the romance literature, from the Lancelot-Grail cycle to Le Morte d'Arthur, Lucan is one of the last knights at the king's side at the Battle of Camlann and is usually the last of them to die. Lucan remained loyal to King Arthur throughout the schism with Lancelot, and on occasion acted as a negotiator between them. Similarly, he stayed by the monarch's side during Mordred's rebellion and tried to dissuade Arthur from his final attack on his son/nephew, but was unsuccessful and the king became fatally wounded. Worried about looters roaming the battlefield, Lucan and Bedivere attempt to move the dying Arthur into a nearby chapel for safety, but the strain is too much for Lucan and his old wound bursts open, spilling out his bowels; he succumbs to his own wounds just before the king returns Excalibur to the Lady of the Lake and sails off for Avalon. Though the knight whom Arthur asks to cast the sword into the lake is usually Griflet (Vulgate Mort Artu) or Bedivere (Le Morte d'Arthur, the Alliterative Morte Arthure, the Stanzaic Morte Arthur), the 16th-century English ballad King Arthur's Death ascribes this duty to Lucan. A character named Lucan appears in the 2004 film King Arthur. Played by Johnny Brennan, he is a young boy found and cared for by Arthur's warrior Dagonet.

Mador de la Porte 

Mador de la Porte (French: Mador, Amador; English: Mador, Madore, Madors; Italian: Amador della porta, Amadore; Irish: Mado) is a minor Knight of the Round Table in the late Arthurian prose romances. His epithet "of the Gate" (de la Porte) suggests he might have been Arthur's porter; if so, Mador might be equated with Glewlwyd Gafaelfawr ("Mightygrasp") who is Arthur's porter in medieval Welsh tales. Mador's best known role is in an episode of the Vulgate Mort Artu (and consequently in the Stanzaic Morte Arthur and Malory's Le Morte d'Arthur) that tells the story of his trial by combat against the incognito Lancelot, Queen Guinevere's champion for her innocence following the poisoning of Mador's brother Gaheris de Karahau. Mador loses the duel to Lancelot (without losing his life in the process), saving Guinevere from the accusation that almost led her being burnt at the stake.

Besides the Vulgate Mort Artu and the English works based on it, Mador also appears or is referenced in several other works, including in the Prose Lancelot, in the "Tournament of Sorelois" episode found in some versions of the Prose Tristan and the Prophecies de Mérlin (as well as in Le Morte d'Arthur), in the Post-Vulgate Cycle, in the Guiron le Courtois part of Palemedes, in Sir Gawaine and the Green Knight, in the Sicilian romance Floriant et Florette, and in the Compilation of Rustichello da Pisa. The Vulgate Mort Artu notes him as exceptionally tall and says there was hardly a knight in Arthur's court who was stronger. This is repeated in the Version I of the Prose Tristan, in which Tristan considers him second only to the half-giant Galehault in size and strength. In Le Morte d'Arthur, he is also a companion of the young Mordred.

The Livre d'Artus version of the Vulgate Merlin Continuation mentions Madoc li Noirs de la Porte (Madoc the Black of the Gate) among the knights who come to the aid of Aglovale to fight against the forces of Agrippe. He may be further identical with the knight Mado, who is twice briefly mentioned in the First Continuation of Chrétien's Perceval. Mado also appears as antagonist in the 16th-century Irish Arthurian tale Eachtra Mhelóra agus Orlando (The Adventures of Melora and Orlando), wherein he is the villainous son of the King of the Hesperides in love with Arthur's daughter Melora, who disguises herself as a man and fights incognito as a knight to defeat Mado and his ally Merlin.

Meliant 

Meliant (Melians, Melyans) is a Knight of the Round Table featured in several chivalric romances. In the writings by Chrétien de Troyes and Wolfram von Eschenbach, Meliant de Lis is the King of Lis. Along with Bagdemagus and Meleagant, he declares war on his foster-father, Tiebaut (Lyppaut), after being rejected by the latter's daughter Obie. Gawain, fighting for Obie's sister Obilot, captures Meliant, who then reconciles with Obie in her captivity. A different version of this story, as told by Heinrich von dem Türlin, names him Fiers von Arramis, whom Gawain also forces to surrender to a young lady who is a sister of his beloved Flursenesephin. In the Livre de Artus, Meliant de Lis wins over and marries Gawain's own lover, Floree.

In the Vulgate Cycle's Queste, Melians de Danemarche (Denmark, Dianarca) is a squire of Galahad, who knights him during the Grail Quest. Later, Sir Melians joins Bors and Percival at Castle Corbenic at the end of the quest. King Arthur appoints him to the Round Table, but he later sides with Lancelot in the civil war in the Vulgate Mort. In reward for his support, including his role in the rescue of Guinevere, Lancelot makes him an earl ruling one of Lancelot's domains on the continent. Malory calls him Melias de Lile (de Lisle) in Le Morte d'Arthur. He should not be confused with Tristan's father Meliadus, who is sometimes known as Melias.

There are also multiple other Arthurian characters by this name. For instance, one Meliant (named Brano in the Italian compilation La Tavola Ritonda) is a relative of King Faramon's daughter Belide when she falsely accuses Tristan of rape in the Prose Tristan. In Perlesvaus, an explicitly villainous Meliant is an enemy lord of Arthur, allied with the traitorous Kay; he is eventually killed by Lancelot who had previously also slain his evil father. In the Vulgate Lancelot, Carados of the Dolorous Tower takes one Melyans le Gai's wife as his mistress. Another Meliant from the same cycle is an ancestor of Gawain (and himself is descended from Peter, an early Christian follower of Joseph of Arimathea) in the Vulgate Estoire del Saint Graal.

Morholt 

Morholt of Ireland (Marha[u]lt, Marhaus, Morold, Amoroldo) is an Irish warrior who demands tribute from King Mark of Cornwall until he is slain by Mark's nephew Tristan. In many versions, Morholt's name is prefaced with a definite article (i.e. The Morholt) as if it were a rank or a title, but scholars have found no reason for this.

He appears in almost all versions of the legend of Tristan and Iseult, beginning with the verse works of Thomas of Britain and Béroul. In the early material, Morholt is the brother of the Queen of Ireland and the uncle of Tristan's future love (both mother and daughter are named Iseult). He comes to Cornwall to collect tribute owed to his country; instead, however, Tristan challenges him to battle on the remote Saint Samson's Isle in order to release his people from the debt. Tristan mortally wounds Morholt, leaving a piece of his sword in the Irishman's skull, but Morholt stabs him with a poisoned spear and escapes to Ireland to die. The injured Tristan eventually travels to Ireland incognito to receive healing from Iseult the Younger, but is found out when the queen discovers the piece of metal found in her brother's head fits perfectly into a chink in Tristan's blade.

The authors of later romances expanded Morholt's role. In works like the Prose Tristan, the Post-Vulgate Cycle, and Thomas Malory's Le Morte d'Arthur, he is a Knight of the Round Table before his fateful encounter with Tristan. The prose romances add many further details to Morholt's career; the Post-Vulgate and Malory record his adventures with the young Gawain, Gaheris and Yvain early in King Arthur's reign. In the later versions, Tristan takes Morholt's place at the Round Table when he joins the company himself.

Nentres
In Arthurian romance, Nentres of Garlot (French: Nentres de Garlot) is a British king of the land of Garlot (Garloth, Garlott), who had served Arthur's father Uther Pendragon. At first, he rebels against the young King Arthur, but soon he becomes Arthur's ally after his defeat and reconciliation, even marrying one of Arthur's sisters. In the Old French Vulgate Merlin, he is also named Uentres and Ventre[s/ƺ], as well as Nantes, Neutre[s] and Nextres de Garloc in the Estoire d'Merlin and Neutre in the version Livre d'Artus. In the Caxton print edition of Malory's Le Morte d'Arthur, he appears as Nentres, Nayntres and Nauntres, while the original Winchester manuscript calls him Nentres, Nauntres and Newtrys. His other medieval English names include Nantres or Nanter[s] in Arthour and Merlin, and Newtres, Newtris, Newtrys and Newtre[s] in Lovelich's Merlin. His first appearance could have been as Arthur's brother-in-law Viautre de Galerot (Guarlerot) in the Didot-Perceval continuation of the Verse Merlin. 

Malory makes Nentres the husband of Arthur's sister Elaine (Elayne), originally named Blasine in the Prose Merlin, by whom he has the son Galeschin and a daughter also named Elaine. In other texts, his wife is one of Arthur's different sisters: either Morgause (Belisent) or Morgan le Fay (Morgain la feé). In the Merlin continuation texts, Nentres of Garlot is one of the kings who refuse to recognise the newly proclaimed King Arthur's claim to be the true heir of Uther, and he joins the others to fight against Arthur (and his own son Galescalain) at the Battle of Bedegraine (where he is defeated by Kay in Malory). After the rebel kings agree to join Arthur to repel the foreign (Saxon or Saracen) invasion, Nentres commands the defense of Windesan. During this time, his wife is kidnapped by the enemy but is rescued by Arthur's loyalist Gawain, making Nentres firmly join Arthur's side and help him to decisively crush the foreigners at the Battle of Clarence. He then becomes one of the original members of Arthur's Round Table and participates in Arthur's continental campaigns, slaying the Spanish Saracen king Alifatima during the war against Rome. 

According to Roger Sherman Loomis, the name and character of King Nentres could have been derived from that of the historical British king Urien who is most often cast as the husband of Morgan. The Huth Merlin mentions Neutre only once as the king of Sorhaut married to Morgan, while presenting Garlot as the kingdom of Urien and Morgain (Morgue), which further suggests the identity of Nentres with Urien. The name of his realm of Garlot may also come from Caer Lot, an Old Welsh for the Fortress of Lot, another British former rebel king often depicted in the legend as married to Arthur's sister. The lands of Nentres, Urien and Lot (Lothian, not Orkney) are also all commonly placed in today's southern Scotland. Nevertheless, the three rebel-turned-ally kings, each later married to Arthur's sisters, regularly appear as separate characters within the same prose romances, including in Malory.

Osenain

Osenain (one of many spelling variants), often appearing with the moniker translating either (depending on the French spelling) as 'Braveheart', 'the Hardhearted', 'the Bold' or 'Hard Body', is a character often appearing as one of the Round Table's knights errant in the works of Arthurian romance. In English, he is best known from Thomas Malory's Le Morte d'Arthur as Ozanna le Cure Hardy (Ozanna le Coeur Hardi in the Winchester Manuscript; rendered as Ozana of the hardy heart in William Morris' "The Chapel in Lyonesse"). Different Middle English versions of the Merlin Continuation call him Gosenain Hardy Body, Gosnayn de Strangot, Osenayn Cors Hardy and Osoman Hardi of Hert. In many works he is associated with the often similarly named nephew of King Arthur, Gawain of Orkney, while being cast as Gawain's companion or opponent.

Like Gawain's, his character is considered to be derived from the prototype of the warrior by the name Gwrvan and its variants, found in the early Welsh Arthurian tales Culhwch ac Olwen, Peredur fab Efrawg, Preiddeu Annwn, and Trioedd Ynys Prydein. Within the chivalric romance tradition, he is first found as Garravain[s] d'Estrangot among Arthur's knights in some manuscripts of Chretien de Troyes' Old French Erec et Enide (Gasosin von Strangot in its German version Erec). He is also listed by the name Gasouains in the First Continuation of Chrétien's Perceval ou le Conte du Graal. In Les Merveilles de Rigomer, Garradains is named as the knight of Arthur traveling with Gawain on a quest to conquer the enchanted castle of the Irish queen Dionise.

In Diu Crône, Gasozein de Dragoz arrives at King Arthur's court and claims to be the first lover and rightful husband of Queen Guinevere, unsuccessfully demanding her to be returned to him. Gasozein later rescues the queen from her brother Gotegrin, who wants to kill Guinevere for her infidelity, but then he kidnaps her in turn and nearly rapes her, however Gawain arrives in time, defeats Gasozein in a duel, sends him back to Arthur to revoke his claim, and even arranges Gasozein's marriage with his own sister-in-law, Sgoidamur. The plot of Meraugis de Portlesguez revolves around the protagonist Meraugis competing for the love of Queen Lidoine with his friend Gorvain Cadrut (Gornain[s], Gornenis; -Cadrus, Cadruz, Kadrus), in addition to dealing with Gawain. Gorvain loses Lidoine to his rival, but ends up happily married to one of her maidens, Avice. In another text, Hunbaut, Gorvain Cadrus of Castle Pantelion takes Gawain's unnamed sister hostage, seeking vengeance against him for the death of one of his relatives. He is taken captive by Gawain, then sent as a prisoner to Arthur's court at Caerleon where he eventually becomes a Knight of the Round Table.

He recurringly features as Osenain[s] Cuer Hardi (Gosenain, Osanain, Osevain, Osoain, Osuain, Oswain, etc.; -Cors Hardi[z], Corsa Hardy, Corps Hardi, au Cœur-Hardi, Chore Ardito) in the Prose Lancelot, and as Ossenain Cuer Hardi (Oselain, Osenaín, Ossenain, Ossenam, Ossenet d'Estrangot) in the Prose Tristan. In the Vulgate Estoire de Merlin (and the English Of Arthour and of Merlin), the young Gasoain d'Estrango[r]t (Gaswain, Gosenain; -of / d'Estrangor[r]e) fights alongside Gawain in the battles against the invading Saxons, his great feats earning him an early seat at the Round Table. When Gawain wrongly accuses him of treason, he gives Gawain a severe face wound in a trial by combat in front of King Arthur. In the Vulgate Lancelot, he is noted as "very valorous and a good speaker", and is involved in the adventures of Kay and others. He is with Gawain when they are both captured and imprisoned in the Dolorous Prison until their rescue by Lancelot, who also later frees him from Turquine's captivity on another occasion. He assists Maleagant of Gore in the abduction of Queen Guinevere and is imprisoned by King Arthur after Lancelot's rescue of her (in Malory's version, he is instead one the loyal Queen's Knights captured by Maleagant along with her). He is later forgiven and fights for Arthur against King Rience, eventually participating in the Grail Quest. The Guiron le Courtois section of Palamedes describes him as son of King Quinados.

In the Italian Tavola Ritonda, Suziano of the Valiant Heart (Cuoe Ardito) is a young son of Lady Largina and uncertainly either King Esclabor the Unknown or King Amorotto (that is, Lamorak) of Listenois, as his promiscuous and power-hungry mother was a lover of both of them at the same time. He comes into service of the evil Lady Losanna of the Ancient Tower (Losanna dela Torre Antica) after falling in love with her, and is slain by Tristan protecting Losanna's enemy Tessina from his attempt on her life. He also appears under the name Guengasoain[s] (Gasouains, Guengasouain, Guingasoain) as the antagonist of La Vengeance Raguidel, in which Gawain and Yder attempt to avenge his murder of the knight Raguidel. Here he is a nephew of King Aguissant (meaning Angusel, a brother of King Lot in the Historia Regum Britanniae) and a knight of the fay enchantress Lingrenote, the lady of the Nameless Castle (Castiel sans Non), who has armed him with powerful enchanted weapons that made him near invincible. He is nevertheless defeated by Gawain with the help of Yder, the latter of whom then marries Guengasoain's orphaned daughter, Trevilonete.

Priamus 
Priamus (Pryamus) is a Roman ally of Emperor Lucius in Malory's Le Morte d'Arthur, following  the Alliterative Morte Arthure. He claims to be descended from Alexander of Africa and Judas Maccabeus. Upon meeting Gawain in "The Tale of King Arthur and Emperor Lucius", he defects from Lucius to join forces with King Arthur. In return, Arthur appoints him as the Duke of Lorraine. He later dies at the fight for Guinevere. In Malory's version, two of Priamus' brothers also become Knights of the Round Table: Edward of Carnarvon and Hectymere.

Safir 

Safir (Safire, Safere, Saphar) is the youngest son of the Saracen king Esclabor in the Arthurian legend. He appeared in several works of Arthurian literature, including the Prose Tristan and Le Morte d'Arthur; his name was also included on the Winchester Round Table. Two of his brothers, Segwarides and Palamedes, also belong to the Round Table.

Safir usually appears alongside his brother Palamedes. In one story, Safir disguises himself as Ector de Maris, fights with Helior le Preuse, defeats him, and wins Espinogres' lady. Vowing to defend the lady's honor, Palamedes arrives and locks swords with Safir, not realizing it is his brother. After fighting for an hour to a standstill, both are impressed with each other's prowess and skill, and decide to ask the other's identity. Safir is devastated to find that he was fighting with his own brother and asks Palamedes for forgiveness; together, they return the lady to Espinogres. Later, after the affair between Lancelot and Guinevere is exposed, Safir and Palamedes join Lancelot's side in the ensuing civil war between Lancelot and King Arthur. When they are banished to Lancelot's homeland in Gaul, Safir is made Duke of Landok while Palamedes becomes Duke of Provence.

Segwarides 

Segwarides (Seguarades, Seguradés, Seguradez, etc.) is a son of the Saracen king Esclabor who becomes a liegeman of King Mark. His other brothers include the fellow Round Table knights Palamedes and Safir. It is possible there have been originally two characters of this name, but the stories in which they appear fail to differentiate between them.

He is cuckolded by Tristan in the Prose Tristan and Thomas Malory's Le Morte d'Arthur. Tristan has a brief affair with Segwarides' wife, and wounds the knight after being found out. Tristan encounters Segwarides again on the Isle of Servage; Segwarides forgives him, saying he "will never hate a noble knight for a light lady," and the two team up to avoid the dangers of the isle. Soon afterwards, Tristan makes Segwarides the Lord of Servage. In Malory, Segwarides is eventually killed trying to repel Lancelot's rescue of Guinevere from the stake.

Tor 

Tor appears frequently in Arthurian literature, albeit always in minor roles. In earlier mentions Tor's father is King Ars (Aries), but in Post-Vulgate Cycle and Thomas Malory's Le Morte d'Arthur, Aries is his adoptive father while his natural father is King Pellinore. His namesake, Le Tor of Scotland, is also featured in the story of Sebile in the Arthurian prequel romance Perceforest.

In the Post-Vulgate and Malory, Tor's many siblings include Aglovale, Drian, Lamorak, Percival, and Dindrane. He is born when Pellinore sleeps with his mother "half by force", and she marries Aries shortly afterward; here Aries is not a king, but a shepherd. The young Tor is also raised as a shepherd but dreams of becoming a knight. His parents take him to the teenage King Arthur, who makes the boy one of his first knights in recognition of his qualities. Later Merlin reveals Tor's true parentage, and Pellinore embraces his son; neither Aries nor his wife seem offended. Tor distinguishes himself at the wedding feast of Arthur and Guinevere when he takes up a quest to retrieve a mysterious white brachet hound that had come into the court. According to Malory, Tor and his brother Aglovale are present among the knights charged by Arthur with guarding the execution of Guinevere and they both die when Lancelot and his followers rescue the queen.

Yvain the Bastard 

Yvain the Bastard (Yvain[s] / Yvonet / Uwains li/le[s] Avou[l]tres, -l'Avo[u]ltre, -li Batarz) is a son of King Urien of Gore, often confused with his half-brother Yvain, after whom he was named. While the older Yvain is Urien's legitimate child from his wife Morgan le Fay, Yvain the Bastard was sired by Urien on the wife of his seneschal. He is encountered frequently in Arthurian romance as a hearty and usually sensible knight, fighting in Arthur's wars and questing for the Holy Grail with Galahad and Gareth. He was killed by his cousin Gawain late during the Grail Quest when the two, disguised by their armour, randomly meet and decide to joust. It is not until Gawain takes him to a hermitage for his last rites that he realizes he has fought, and killed, his own cousin.

Thomas Malory in Le Morte d'Arthur split him into two characters: Uwaine les Avoutres, the son of Urien, and Uwaine les Adventurous, an unrelated knight. Malory further splits Morganor, the name of Urien's "good knight" bastard son in Of Arthour and of Merlin, into a separate character he calls Sir Morganor[e] (first appearing as a senschal of the King of the Hundred Knights, then as a king himself). Yvain the Bastard and Yvain les Avoutres are also separate characters in the Scottish Lancelot of the Laik. In Perlesvaus, Yvain the Bastard's own son named Cahus dies while serving as Arthur's own squire on a strange adventure, killed by a giant in a deadly dream.

Yvain of the White Hands 

Yvain of the White Hands (Yvain/Yvonet aux Blanches Mains) is another different Knight of the Round Table named Yvain in the Old French romances. There, and in the English Arthour and Merlin, he is unrelated to Iseult of the White Hands and to the "main" Yvain (son of Urien), although Thomas Malory later merged him with the latter. He serves Arthur in the Saxon wars, later participating in the quests to learn the fate of Merlin and to find the missing Lancelot. In Palamedes, he is son of a knight named Darie. In the Prose Tristan, he is injured by King Mark and healed in a Cornish abbey. In the Post-Vulgate Queste, he is mistakenly slain by Erec, for which in turn Erec is killed by Gawain, and his seat at the Round Table is then taken by the Unknown Knight (Arthur the Less).

Other Arthurian fellowships

Queen's Knights 

The Queen's Knights (Chevaliers de la Roine) are the knights who serve King Arthur's wife Queen Guinevere in the Old French prose cycles. They are also known in French texts as the "Knights of Queen Guinevere" (Chevaliers de la Roine Guenievre, the form used in the Livre d'Artus) and the more elaborate "Valiant Knights of Queen Guinevere" (Chevalier vaillant de la Roine Gueneure). Members of this group carry only plain white shields, often accompanying the queen and engaging in rivalry against the more experienced Knights of the Round Table. Heroes Gawain and  Lancelot are among those who first serve as the Queen's Knights in their youth after being knighted by Arthur, before winning enough honour to be promoted to fill the Round Table when a vacancy occurs. Others include the young Sagramore when he mortally wounds the Knight of the Round Table named Agravadain (unrelated to Agravain), grandfather of Hector de Maris, in defense of his comrades.

In the Middle English compilation Le Morte d'Arthur, the simple "Queen's Knights" form is used by the author Thomas Malory who also describes them as "a grete felyshyp of men of arms". In Malory's version, Lancelot later rescues a new generation of them when they are captured together with Guinevere by the villain Maleagant (himself sometimes depicted as a rogue member of the Round Table), after the Queen ordered her knightly companions to surrender as to not forfeit their lives.

Arthur's minor tables 
The Post-Vulgate Cycle has two other table-based orders within Arthur's court. The first of these is the Table of Errant Companions (Tables des Compaignons Errans), reserved for the knights errant who are actively seeking adventures while awaiting promotion to the Round Table.

The second one is rather ingloriously called the Table of Less-Valued Knights (Tables des Chevaliers Moins Prisiés), the members of which (who originally included Perceval) are, as its name indicates, lower in their rank and status. This group seems to be derived from the knights of the Watch (also translated as the Guard), featured in the Vulgate Cycle's Prose Lancelot and first mentioned by Chrétien in Perceval.

Round Table predecessors 
Robert de Boron's Joseph d'Arimathie introduced the Grail Table as a direct precursor to the Round Table, once used by the followers of Joseph of Arimathea, one of the earliest Christians and a relative of Jesus. They were the original guardians of the Grail, who have traveled from the Holy Land to Britain centuries prior to the times of Arthur. In the cyclical prose continuations of Robert's poem, their descendants include Lancelot and the Fisher King. The Grail Table is again briefly used by the holy knight Galahad (offspring of the union between Lancelot and the Fisher King's daughter) when he and his companions (Percival and Bors) are served mass after successfully completing the Grail Quest.

Some French and Italian prose romances and poetry feature the original fifty knights of the Round Table from the times of Uther Pendragon, the late father of King Arthur. It is known in Italian retellings of the Prose Tristan as the Old Table (Tavola Vecchia), contrasting with those of Arthur's Round Table known as the New Table (Tavola Nuova). Their stories include that of Branor the Dragon Knight, "the flower of the Old Table", still unsurpassed in his skills at the age of over 100. Following the death of Uther, the Round Table is kept in possession of King Leondegrance until he gives it to the young Arthur as the dowry of his daughter Guinevere.

An even earlier forerunner of the Round Table appears in Perceforest, where Arthur's distant ancestor, the eponymous King Perceforest, establishes the elite Order of the Franc Palais (Ordre du Franc Palais) to fight against the forces of darkness; the Order ends up destroyed by the evil Julius Caesar during his invasion of Britain. This happens even before the birth of Christ, but nevertheless is presented in the author's contemporary High Middle Ages style setting just like the other Arthurian romances; as willed by the Sovereign God (Dieu Souverain, here apparently the coming Christian god to whom the Roman and other pagan deities willingly submit and work for), the Franc Palais numbers the selected 300 British knights chosen for their valor and seated in the specially constructed building by the same name.

See also
List of Arthurian characters
Paladin
Pentecostal Oath
Siege Perilous

References

Sources
Chrétien de Troyes; Owen, D. D. R. (translator) (1988). Arthurian Romances. New York: Everyman's Library. .
Lacy, Norris J. (Ed.) (1 April 1995). Lancelot-Grail: The Old French Arthurian Vulgate and Post-Vulgate in Translation, Volume 4 of 5. New York: Garland. .
Loomis, Roger Sherman (1997). Celtic Myth and Arthurian Romance. Academy Chicago Publishers. .
Malory, Thomas; Bryan, Elizabeth J. (introduction) (1994). Le Morte d'Arthur. New York: Modern Library. . (Pollard text.)
Wilson, Robert H. The "Fair Unknown" in Malory. Publications of the Modern-Language Association of America (1943).

External links

EBK: The Knights of the Round Table
Timeless Myths: Round Table

 
Arthurian legend
Fictional knights
Round Table